The 1977 Copa Libertadores was the 18th edition of CONMEBOL's top club tournament. The tournament was won by Boca Juniors after defeating defending champions Cruzeiro for their first Copa Libertadores title.

Group stage
Groups are organized by countries, with two teams from two countries composing a group. The top team from each group moves onto the next round (semi-finals). Defending champions Cruzeiro received a bye to the second round.

Group 1
The teams from Group 1 were composed of the qualified teams from Argentina & Uruguay.

Group 2
The teams from Group 2 were composed of the qualified teams from Colombia & Bolivia.

Group 3
The teams from Group 3 were composed of the qualified teams from Brazil & Ecuador.

Group 4
The teams from Group 4 were composed of the qualified teams from Chile & Paraguay.

Group 5
The teams from Group 5 were composed of the qualified teams from Peru & Venezuela.

Semi-finals
The top finishers of each group in the first phase, plus the defending champions, are placed into two groups of three. The top finisher from each group play in the finals.

Group A

Group B

Finals

The winner is determined by points (i.e., whoever wins the most of two games); goal difference or aggregate score is not used. If the points are tied after two games, a single-game playoff at a neutral sight will be played. If the game is tied after regulation, a penalty shootout will determine the winner.

External links
Copa Libertadores 1977 on CONMEBOL's site (In Spanish)
In English
Tournament on RSSSF

1
Copa Libertadores seasons